Life in Shadows (Spanish:Vida en sombras) is a 1949 Spanish drama film directed by Lorenzo Llobet Gracia and starring Fernando Fernán Gómez, María Dolores Pradera and Isabel de Pomés. It was made in Barcelona.

Cast
 Fernando Fernán Gómez as Carlos  
 María Dolores Pradera as Ana 
 Isabel de Pomés as Clara  
 Fernando Sancho as Productor 
 Alfonso Estela as Luis  
 Graciela Crespo as Sra. Durán  
 Félix de Pomés as Señor Durán  
 Mary Santpere as Doncella 
 Marta Flores as Esposa  
 Miquel Graneri as Marido  
 Jesús Puche as Fotógrafo  
 Valero as Carlos, niño  
 Juan López as Luis, niño 
 Antonia Llobet as Ana, niña  
 Antonio Leal as Comandante  
 Tomás Gutiérrez Larraya as Vendedor de Films Selectos 
 Hernández as Otor vendedor  
 Joaquín Soler Serrano as (voice)  
 Enrique Tusquets as Hombre del puro  
 Arturo Cámara as Comandante
 Camino Garrigó as Madre de Ana  
 María Severini as Dueña de la pensión

References

Bibliography 
 Marsha Kinder. Blood Cinema: The Reconstruction of National Identity in Spain. University of California Press, 1993.

External links 
 

1949 films
1949 drama films
Spanish drama films
1940s Spanish-language films
Spanish black-and-white films
1940s Spanish films